Timothy David Johnston (born 1949) is an English-born American developmental psychologist who specializes in the evolution and development of behavior. He is a professor of Psychology at the University of North Carolina at Greensboro (UNC Greensboro), where he is also Dean Emeritus of the College of Arts & Sciences. He served as Dean of the UNC Greensboro's College of Arts & Sciences from 2002 to 2016, as president of the Council of Colleges of Arts and Sciences from 2014 to 2015, and as Head of the Department of Psychology at UNC Greensboro from 1997 to 2002.

References

External links
Faculty page

1949 births
Living people
English emigrants to the United States
21st-century American psychologists
American developmental psychologists
Scientists from Manchester
University of North Carolina at Greensboro faculty
Alumni of the University of Edinburgh
University of Wisconsin–Madison alumni
University of Connecticut alumni
20th-century American psychologists